"Bomb the World" is a protest song single by Michael Franti & Spearhead from their album "Everyone Deserves Music". The Independent has called it "Franti's s response to September 11".

A remix called "Bomb The World" (Armageddon Mix) was produced by reggae/funk performers Sly and Robbie.

Reception

In 2003, the New Internationalist described the song as "the anthem of a new generation of anti-war protesters", praising its "stirring chorus" and its "coda ready-made for marching". In 2015, however, the Chicago Tribune called it "a lighthearted, mid-tempo pop song that recalls Bob Marley and Johnny Nash."

Track listings
US CD
 "Bomb The World" (LP version) – 4:28
 "Bomb The World" (Armageddon version) – 4:44

Official versions
 "Bomb The World" (LP version) – 4:28
 "Bomb The World" (Armageddon version) – 4:44

References

2003 singles
Reggae songs
Michael Franti songs
2003 songs
Songs written by Michael Franti